The Austrian nobility is a status group that was officially abolished in 1919 after the fall of Austria-Hungary. The nobles are still part of Austrian society today, but they no longer retain any specific privileges. Austria's system of nobility was very similar to Germany's (see German nobility), as both countries were previously part of the Holy Roman Empire (962–1806).

Any noble living in the Habsburg-ruled lands, and who owed allegiance to the dynasty and therefore to the Emperor, was also considered part of the Austrian aristocracy. This applied to any member of the Bohemian, Hungarian, Polish, Croatian, and other nobilities in the Habsburg dominions. Attempting to differentiate between ethnicities can be difficult, especially for nobles during the eras of the Holy Roman Empire and the Austro-Hungarian monarchy (1867–1918). A noble from Galicia, for instance, such as the Count Jordan-Rozwadowski (see section "Noble titles" below under Graf/Gräfin (count/countess)), could call himself a Polish noble, but he also rightfully belonged to the Austrian nobility.

Two categories among the Austrian nobility may be distinguished: the historic nobility that lived in the territories of the Habsburg Empire and who owed allegiance to the head of that dynasty until 1918, and the post-1918 descendants of Austrian nobility—specifically, those who retain Austrian citizenship, whose family originally come from Austria proper, South Tyrol, northern Italy and Burgenland, or who were ennobled at any point under Habsburg rule and identify themselves as belonging to that status group.

History 

From 1453, the Archduke of Austria had the right to bestow titles and ranks upon non-nobles, as did the Archbishop of Salzburg, as Salzburg remained an independent territory. Besides the Holy Roman Emperor (an office which was almost uninterruptedly held by the Archduke (of the House of Habsburg) from 1438 to 1806), only a few territorial rulers within the Empire had this right. In an era of Absolutism, the nobility residing in the cities slowly turned itself into the court nobility (Hofadel). Service at the court became the primary goal of the nobility. This in turn initiated an interest in education and the interests of the court. Within the court, a close inner circle, called the 100 Familien (100 families), possessed enormous riches and lands. They also had great influence at the court and thus played an important role in politics and diplomacy.

After the end of the Holy Roman Empire in 1806, the Habsburg rulers, who were Emperors of Austria from 1804 onwards, continued to elevate individuals to nobility until the end of the monarchy in 1918. Some of the noble families even obtained the right to be seated in the Herrenhaus (House of Lords), the upper house of the Reichsrat (Imperial Council). Nobles from previously sovereign states such as those in northern Italy (Venice, Mantua, Milan) were also recognized by the authorities and were allowed to keep their titles and rights.

Burgenland 
On the former status of nobility in Burgenland, which was part of the Kingdom of Hungary until 1921, see Hungarian nobility.

Jewish nobles
A few very wealthy Jewish families were ennobled after the Toleranzedikt vom 1782 ("1782 Edict of Tolerance") decreed by Emperor Joseph II. Under this Edict, very wealthy Jewish bankers, and later entrepreneurs and industrialists—some of them court Jews—could also be ennobled for their services. Jews had been ennobled mostly, as was common with all newly ennobled families, with lesser noble ranks, but also with peerages such as Freiherr (Baron). The few Jewish families elevated into the nobility were not required to forswear their faith, but some of these families converted to Christianity in order to become more accepted. Although elevation into the nobility meant recognition for civic contributions and services, and entailed a rise in social status, it did not alter the fact that Jews were, for the most part, still only "tolerated" at best. Jews could not freely choose the place and duration of their stay and had to regularly ask for permission from the authorities. This placed a huge burden on Jewish families; if the head of the family died, all his relatives had to leave the city. The right to purchase real estate was forbidden to Jews, even if they belonged to the nobility. This regulation stayed in place until 1860, when it was abolished by Emperor Franz Joseph I and Jewish citizens were given equal rights. When the banker and protector of arts Raymund Karl Wetzler von Plankenstern was created a Reichsfreiherr (Baron of the Empire) by Empress Maria Theresia, he converted to Catholicism while still young. His mansion in Vienna was a center of the fine arts and he was a close friend of Mozart, as his son Alexander was of Ludwig van Beethoven.

Despite these difficulties, by 1821 there were at least eleven ennobled Jewish families living in Vienna alone: the Rothschild, Arnstein, Eskeles, Gomperz, Kuffner, Lieben, Auspitz, Schey von Koromla, Todesco, Goluchowski-Glochowsky, Wertheimstein, and Wiernes families. In 1830 the Jewish von Neumann family were elevated into the nobility. The elevation into the nobility of wealthy Jews also started the process of assimilation of Jewish families into the Austrian upper class.

Abolition of nobility in 1919 
With the same date, the Habsburgergesetz of 1919 ("Habsburg Law"), which legally dethroned, exiled and confiscated the properties of the Imperial House of Habsburg, the Adelsaufhebungsgesetz (Arbitration Act) of 3 April 1919 ("Law on the Abolition of Nobility") abolished nobility as well as all noble privileges, titles and names in Austria. In other monarchies of Europe, Austrian noble families may use their noble titles as well as nobiliary particles such as von and zu in their names and they still retain noble status there. For example, the name of the heir to the Austro-Hungarian throne became in Austria simply Karl Habsburg-Lothringen instead of Karl von Habsburg; in Belgium, however, he is known as Archduke Karl of Austria.

This may sometimes be confusing, as descendants of nobles are sometimes referred to with noble names abroad. Also, members of noble families often hold multiple citizenships, as was the case for Otto von Habsburg (eldest son of the last Emperor of Austria-Hungary and father of Karl Habsburg-Lothringen), who was also a citizen of Germany. The Austrian law does not apply to artistic, performer or stage names, where von is sometimes used, as in the case of conductor Herbert von Karajan or the musician Hubert von Goisern. However, stage names are never recognized for official purposes.

Members of the lower nobility especially (such as civil servants) found this radical step of abolition degrading and humiliating, since working towards and finally earning a noble title was a way for them and their families to rise within society. Members of the higher nobility were able to absorb the formal abolition more easily. They lost their titles and privileges, but kept their social networks, manners, standing and riches. Federal President Michael Hainisch called the official abolition

The law abolishing nobility and titles was never repealed, even during the period of Austrofascism (1934–1938). Following the Anschluss to Nazi Germany (1938–1945), this law remained on the books, although it was not enforced, allowing Austrian nobles to use titles freely again.

Although noble titles and the particles von and zu are no longer legal, some persons are still unofficially referred to by their titles. For example, Karl Schwarzenberg will occasionally still be referred to as Fürst zu Schwarzenberg (Prince zu Schwarzenberg) in the media; he holds Czech and Swiss citizenship, not Austrian.

Unlike the nobility in Bohemia (Czechoslovakia), Poland, Russia, or the former Prussian territories, the Austrian nobility never had its lands and riches confiscated in Austria (except the Imperial House of Habsburg, which had its properties legally confiscated by the Austrian republican government in 1919). Social measures were introduced by the republican government in order to create more equality amongst the citizens and finance public projects, which put a strain on the traditional land-holding gentry and aristocracy, resulting in the forced sale of many palaces and lands due to the expense of their upkeep. However, there was no measure by the government specifically to target nobility and take away their possessions.

Still, the nobility today are sometimes nonetheless treated slightly differently from other citizens. Austrian nobility still plays a large part in movies made after World War II (for example, Sissi and The Sound of Music), and is still featured regularly in the media and literature. The social events of nobles are still covered extensively in tabloids. Besides, the law is often broken on occasions when members of the nobility are addressed at various events: at the annual birthday celebration of Emperor Franz Joseph in Bad Ischl, for example, members of the former Imperial House of Habsburg are addressed as "Imperial and Royal Highness".

Apart from the prohibition of their titles, some former nobles still make up some of the richest families in Austria, such as the Esterházy, Mayr-Melnhof and Mautner-Markhof. Many members of the Austrian nobility today work in the traditional fields of diplomacy, politics, have business and financial interests, or are philanthropists or socialites.

It was estimated that there were about 20,000 Austrian nobles in 2005. That year, an association was founded, the Vereinigung der Edelleute in Österreich (Association of Austrian Nobles, or V.E.Ö.), which sees itself as the successor of the Vereinigung katholischer Edelleute in Österreich (Catholic Association of Austrian Nobles, or V.E.Ö.), founded in 1922 but banned under the Nazis in 1938. Until recently, all of the various attempts at revival were blocked by Austrian authorities.

Categories of nobility
Austria's nobility was divided into three categories: the mediatized nobility (standesherrlicht), the higher nobility (hoher Adel), and the lower nobility (niederer Adel):

Non-ruling members of the imperial family
Non-ruling members of the imperial family held various titles:
The wife of the emperor (Kaiser) bore the title of empress (Kaiserin) and was styled Her Imperial Majesty.
Agnates of the imperial family and their authorized wives bore the title of archduke/archduchess (Erzherzog/Erzherzogin) and styled  Imperial and Royal Highness (Kaiserliche und königliche Hoheit).
Legitimate but morganatic descendants of the imperial family were excluded from the line of succession, but might sometimes receive lesser titles with noble rather than royal prerogatives, e.g.:

 Prince von Hohenberg, later further created duke (Herzog) and styled Highness (Hoheit)
 Prince von Montenuovo,
 Duke of Reichstadt,
 Margrave von Burgau,
 Count von Meran,

Titles of mediatized nobility 
(English titles with German equivalents)
 Prince/Princess of the Holy Roman Empire (Reichsfürst/Reichsfürstin)
 Imperial Count/Countess (Reichsgraf/Reichsgräfin)
 A title with the prefix Reichs- indicates its being granted by a past Holy Roman Emperor, ranking above other titles of the same or higher nominal rank.

Titles of higher nobility 
(English titles with German equivalents)

 Prince/Princess (Fürst/Fürstin)
 Margrave/Margravine (Markgraf/Markgräfin)
 Count/Countess (Graf/Gräfin)

Titles of lower nobility 
(English titles with German equivalents)
 Baron/Baroness (Freiherr/Freifrau and Freiin)
 Knight (Ritter) (no female version existed)
 Edler/Edle
 In German, a distinction between baronesses exists, a Freifrau being a baroness by marriage and Freiin being a baroness by birth. The title of Ritter is equivalent to the British baronet (i.e., hereditary knight), and Edler means "noble".

Use of nobiliary particles, such as the prepositions "von", "zu", variations such as "van" and "vom", or combinations ("von und zu"), common until after World War I (non-German-speaking nobility preferred to use "de"), were also banned by the 1919 Law on the Abolition of Nobility.

Titles of nobility
Below is an incomplete list of Austrian noble families, listed by rank of title. Note that some members of a family were sometimes given higher titles by the emperor because of merit. Titles, styles, and rights could only be conferred by the monarch. In some cases, they could even be revoked because of fall from favour.

Fürst/Fürstin (prince/princess) 

The style of address was usually "Serene Highness" (Durchlaucht) or the lower style of "Princely Grace" (Fürstliche Gnaden). Although Herzog ("duke") was officially a higher title than Fürst, the former was rare in Austria, except among sovereign and mediatized houses (e.g., the House of Liechtenstein as Herzog von Jägerndorf und Troppau, and the House of Croÿ as Herzog von Croÿ). The princely title was the most prestigious of the Austrian nobility, usually borne by heads of families whose cadets were generally counts/countesses, although in some mediatized princely families (Reichsfürsten) members were allowed to bear the same title as cadets of royalty: prince/princess (Prinz/Prinzessin) with the style of Serene Highness.

Markgraf/Markgräfin (margrave/margravine) 

 Pallavicini

Graf/Gräfin (count/countess) 

Mediatized counts were often entitled to the style of "Illustrious Highness" (Erlaucht). Ranking below them were the comital families of ancient lineage, wealth and influence who were recognized as such in Austria, but had not been Counts of the Empire (Reichsgrafen) prior to 1806; these counts bore the lower style of "High-born" (Hochgeboren).

Freiherr/Freifrau/Freiin (baron/baroness) 

There was no official style, but "Gnädiger Herr" (Gracious Lord), "Gnädige Frau", or "Gnädiges Fräulein" (Gracious Lady) were common forms of address. Although strictly speaking the title was Freiherr, the usage of "Baron" in written and verbal communication was very common, even if incorrect. The title Freiin was also often replaced for "geborene (née) Baronin", which was strictly speaking also incorrect since a Baronin would have been married already.

Ritter (knight) 
There was no official style, but "Gnädiger Herr" was a common form of address. The title was for males only; no female version existed. Female members of a family with the title Ritter however were often addressed as "Edle von",  which was incorrect unless the family already carried the Edler honour before being raised to the Ritter class.

Edler/Edle 
The rank of Edler carried no official style, but "Gnädiger Herr" or "Gnädige Frau" were common forms of address.

Erbsälzer 
This title belonged to the patricians of the free city of Werl, in Germany, who had the hereditary (erb-) right to exploit the nearby salt mines (salz). Thus this title was not granted in Austria, but merely recognized there.

 (von) Lilien
 (von) Papen

Untitled noble families or status unknown

Gallery

Notes

References

Literature 

 von Coudenhove-Kalergi, Richard. Adel. Vienna. 1923.
 Frank-Döfering, Peter. Adelslexikon des österreichischen Kaisertums 1804–1918 (in German). Herder, Vienna 1989. .
.
 Siegert, Heinz. Adel in Österreich(in German). Vienna 1971.
 Stekl, Hannes. Adel und Bürgertum in der Habsburgermonarchie 18. bis 20. Jahrhundert(in German). Oldenbourg, Vienna 2004. 
 Walterskirchen, Gudula. Blaues Blut für Österreich (in German). Amalthea, Vienna 2000. 
 Walterskirchen, Gudula. Der verborgene Stand. Adel in Österreich heute (in German). Amalthea, Vienna 2007. 
 Der Gotha. Supplement. Der "Österreich-Gotha". Mit Ergänzungswerken zum deutschen Adel (in German). Saur, Munich 1997.

External links 

 Vereinigung der Edelleute in Österreich Homepage of the Association of Austrian Nobles
 Österreichisches Familienregister Database of all Austrian noble families
 Tiroler Adler Database of all Tyrolean noble families
 Stiftung Seeau|Lexikon Adel Online encyclopedia about nobility in Austria
 Heraldisch-Genealogische Gesellschaft ADLER Wien Homepage of Heraldic Genealogy Society EAGLE in Vienna
 The new Nobility in the Czech Lands and Danubian Monarchy Homepage of Jan Županič und Michal Fiala (Prague)